Su esposa diurna is a 1944 Argentine romantic comedy film, directed by Enrique Cahen Salaberry. It stars Alejandro Flores, Jacqueline Dumont, Francisco Álvarez and Nury Montsé. The script was written by Alejandro Verbitsky and Emilio Villalba Welsh.

Plot 
An entomologist and a gym teacher who pretend to be married to get a grant and go on a scientific expedition end up falling in love.

Cast
 Alejandro Flores
 Jacqueline Dumont
 Francisco Álvarez
 Nury Montsé
 Adrián Cúneo
 Carlos Morganti
 Enrique Chaico
 Olimpio Bobbio
 Alberto Terrones

Reception
La Nación found the film entertaining and funny and critic Roland opined in Diario Crítica that the film "has the uncommon quality of its permanent ameneity".

References

External links
 

1944 films
1940s Spanish-language films
Films directed by Enrique Cahen Salaberry
Argentine romantic comedy films
1944 romantic comedy films
1940s Argentine films